Kavanagh QC is a British television series made by Central Television for ITV between 1995 and 2001. All five series are available on DVD in both Region 1 and Region 2.

Plot
The series starred John Thaw as barrister James Kavanagh QC, who comes from a working-class upbringing in Bolton, Greater Manchester.  Although having been alluded to in Series 1 Episode 1, this is only revealed in later episodes as his parents' health deteriorates and through an exchange with a colleague who presumed that Kavanagh was actually a Yorkshireman. Plus, on one occasion Kavanagh dashes off to catch Bolton Wanderers play in a televised football match. The series deals with his battles in the courtroom as well as his domestic dramas which include the death of his devoted and affectionate wife. Later he begins dating a fellow barrister.

In court, Kavanagh is usually seen to be defending a client who seems likely to be convicted until a twist in the case occurs, but occasionally Kavanagh is seen in a prosecuting role. The main plot often features Kavanagh confronting cases with a subtext of racism, sexism or other prejudice.  In sub-plots comedy came from the pomposity and self-absorption of Jeremy, a posh barrister in chambers. Kavanagh will not stand for injustice and is never bullied by threats or bribes from those whom he is up against in the courtroom.

Cast
 John Thaw as James Kavanagh, Q.C. (Series 1–5)
 Oliver Ford Davies as Peter Foxcott, Q.C. (Series 1–5)
 Nicholas Jones as Jeremy Aldermarten, Q.C. (Series 1–5)
 Cliff Parisi as Tom Buckley (Series 1–5)
 Lisa Harrow as Lizzie Kavanagh (Series 1–3)
 Tom Brodie as Matt Kavanagh (Series 1–5)
 Daisy Bates as Kate Kavanagh (Series 1–5)
 Anna Chancellor as Julia Piper (Series 1–3)
 Jenny Jules as Alex Wilson (Series 1–4)
 Valerie Edmond as Emma Taylor (Series 4)
 Arkie Whiteley as Helen Ames (Series 2–3)
 Geraldine James as Eleanor Harker, Q.C. (Series 1–5)
 Ewan McGregor as David Robert Armstrong (1 episode)

Episode list
Several online sources list two additional episodes in series four: 7. "Ceremony of Innocence" (28 April 1998) and 8. "Seasons of Mist" (5 May 1998), the plot descriptions of which are identical to two episodes broadcast in series five: 3. "Time of Need" (22 March 1999) and 4. "End Games" (29 March 1999). This was due to a scheduling change which prevented these two episodes from airing at their scheduled time. Later broadcast as part of series five, they were re-titled to avoid confusion.

Series overview

Series 1 (1995)

Series 2 (1996)

Series 3 (1997)

Series 4 (1998)

Series 5 (1999)

Special (2001)

References

External links 
 
 

ITV television dramas
1995 British television series debuts
2001 British television series endings
1990s British drama television series
1990s British legal television series
2000s British drama television series
Carlton Television
Television series by ITV Studios
English-language television shows
Television shows produced by Central Independent Television